The NWA Florida Heavyweight Championship was a major title in Championship Wrestling from Florida, USA and is now the major title in NWA Florida Wrestling Alliance. It started in 1937 and was abandoned in 1949. It was picked back up in 1966 by CWF and lasted until 1987 when the company was purchased by Jim Crockett Promotions. In 1988, the newly created Florida Championship Wrestling (FCW), soon renamed Pro Wrestling Federation (PWF), picked it back up in 1988 and it continued its lineage through NWA Florida, until they ceased operations in 2006. In 2009, Pro Wrestling Fusion revived the title until they left the NWA in 2011.  For several months in 2012, a new Championship Wrestling from Florida affiliated with the NWA, briefly reviving the title until NWA Florida Underground Wrestling took over the championship.

Title history

See also
Florida Championship Wrestling
National Wrestling Alliance

References

Sources
Florida Heavyweight Championship at wrestling-titles.com

Championship Wrestling from Florida championships
National Wrestling Alliance championships
National Wrestling Alliance state wrestling championships
Professional wrestling in Florida